The 2008–09 Barys Astana season was the Kontinental Hockey League franchise's 1st season and the last season of play at the Kazakhstan Hockey Championship, in parallel.

In 2008, Barys applied to join the newly formed Kontinental Hockey League. The league's authorities allowed Barys in, making it the first Kazakh team into the new league. The team won its first game in the KHL on September 3, 2008 abroad, defeating Neftekhimik Nizhnekamsk 2-1 in the shootouts. They registered their first home game eleven days later by beating defending Russian champions Salavat Yulaev Ufa 3-2, this time again in shootout. The team finished its first season with a 15th place overall in the league (5th out of 6 in the highly competitive Chernyshev division). The team made the playoffs and faced Ak Bars Kazan in the first round (2nd overall in the league); Kazan swept Astana three games to nothing to advance to the second round. Kevin Dallman finished the season as the league's fifth best scorer with a 28 goals and 30 assists (58 points) record; he also finished as the league's leader for shots on goal with 217. Konstantin Glazachev finished 9th overall in the league in scoring with 52 points (28 goals and 24 assists). Meanwhile, the team secured a second straight  Kazakhstan Hockey Championship title.

Standings

Kontinental Hockey League

Divisional standings

Kazakhstan Hockey Championship

Final round

Schedule and results

Kontinental Hockey League

Regular season

|-  style="text-align:center; background:#d0e7ff;"
| 1 || September 3 || Neftekhimik Nizhnekamsk || 2-1 (SO) || Denis Franskevich || Neftekhimik Ice Palace || 5,500 || 0-0-1-0 || 2 || 
|-  style="text-align:center; background:#fcc;"
| 2 || September 5 || Lada Togliatti || 1-2 || Denis Franskevich || Volgar Sports Palace || 2,900 || 0-1-1-0 || 2 || 
|-  style="text-align:center; background:#fcc;"
| 3 || September 7 || Ak Bars Kazan || 2-3 || Marc Lamothe || TatNeft Arena || 4,600 || 0-2-1-0 || 2 || 
|-  style="text-align:center; background:#fcc;"
| 4 || September 11 || Traktor Chelyabinsk || 3-4 || Denis Franskevich || Kazakhstan Sports Palace || 4,200 || 0-3-1-0 || 2 || 
|-  style="text-align:center; background:#fcc;"
| 5 || September 12 || Metallurg Magnitogorsk || 3-4 || Marc Lamothe || Kazakhstan Sports Palace || 3,900 || 0-4-1-0 || 2 || 
|-  style="text-align:center; background:#d0e7ff;"
| 6 || September 14 || Salavat Yulaev Ufa || 3-2 (SO) || Marc Lamothe || Kazakhstan Sports Palace || 4,500 || 0-4-2-0 || 4 || 
|-  style="text-align:center; background:#d0e7ff;"
| 7 || September 16 || Neftekhimik Nizhnekamsk || 3-2 (OT) || Marc Lamothe || Kazakhstan Sports Palace || 3,500 || 0-4-3-0 || 6 || 
|-  style="text-align:center; background:#fcc;"
| 8 || September 17 || Ak Bars Kazan || 2-7 || Alexei Kuznetsov || Kazakhstan Sports Palace || 5,200 || 0-5-3-0 || 6 || 
|-  style="text-align:center; background:#cfc;"
| 9 || September 21 || Amur Khabarovsk || 2-1 || Denis Franskevich || Platinum Arena || 7,100 || 1-5-3-0 || 9 || 
|-  style="text-align:center; background:#cfc;"
| 10 || September 23 || Sibir Novosibirsk || 4-2 || Denis Franskevich || Ice Sports Palace Sibir || 5,500 || 2-5-3-0 || 12 || 
|-  style="text-align:center; background:#cfc;"
| 11 || September 26 || Metallurg Novokuznetsk || 4-3 || Denis Franskevich || Kuznetsk Metallurgists Arena || 5,200 || 3-5-3-0 || 15 || 
|-  style="text-align:center; background:#fcc;"
| 12 || September 29 || Atlant Moscow Oblast || 3-4 || Denis Franskevich || Kazakhstan Sports Palace || 5,000 || 3-6-3-0 || 15 || 
|-

|-  style="text-align:center; background:#cfc;"
| 13 || October 1 || HC MVD || 4-2 || Marc Lamothe || Kazakhstan Sports Palace || 4,200 || 4-6-3-0 || 18 || 
|-  style="text-align:center; background:#cfc;"
| 14 || October 2 || Torpedo Nizhny Novgorod || 3-0 || Alexei Kuznetsov || Kazakhstan Sports Palace || 3,500 || 5-6-3-0 || 21 || 
|-  style="text-align:center; background:#ffeeaa;"
| 15 || October 8 || CSKA Moscow || 3-4 (OT) || Alexei Kuznetsov || CSKA Ice Palace || 4,100 || 5-6-3-1 || 22 || 
|-  style="text-align:center; background:#d0e7ff;"
| 16 || October 10 || Vityaz Chekhov || 5-4 (OT) || Denis Franskevich || Ice Hockey Center 2004 || 2,000 || 5-6-4-1 || 24 || 
|-  style="text-align:center; background:#fcc;"
| 17 || October 12 || Spartak Moscow || 3-4 || Alexei Kuznetsov || Luzhniki Minor Arena || 2,900 || 5-7-4-1 || 24 || 
|-  style="text-align:center; background:#fcc;"
| 18 || October 14 || Neftekhimik Nizhnekamsk || 2-4 || Denis Franskevich || Neftekhimik Ice Palace || 4,500 || 5-8-4-1 || 24 || 
|-  style="text-align:center; background:#cfc;"
| 19 || October 18 || Dinamo Minsk || 5-2 || Alexei Kuznetsov || Kazakhstan Sports Palace || 5,000 || 6-8-4-1 || 27 || 
|-  style="text-align:center; background:#cfc;"
| 20 || October 20 || Dinamo Riga || 3-0 || Alexei Kuznetsov || Kazakhstan Sports Palace || 5,000 || 7-8-4-1 || 30 || 
|-  style="text-align:center; background:#d0e7ff;"
| 21 || October 22 || Dynamo Moscow || 5-4 (SO) || Alexei Kuznetsov || Kazakhstan Sports Palace || 5,500 || 7-8-5-1 || 32 || 
|-  style="text-align:center; background:#cfc;"
| 22 || October 26 || Torpedo Nizhny Novgorod || 3-2 || Alexei Kuznetsov || Trade Union Sport Palace || 5,400 || 8-8-5-1 || 35 || 
|-  style="text-align:center; background:#cfc;"
| 23 || October 28 || Severstal Cherepovets || 6-2 || Alexei Kuznetsov || Ice Palace Cherepovets || 2,700 || 9-8-5-1 || 38 || 
|-  style="text-align:center; background:#fcc;"
| 24 || October 30 || Lokomotiv Yaroslavl || 1-7 || Alexei Kuznetsov || Arena 2000 || 9,046 || 9-9-5-1 || 38 || 
|-

|-  style="text-align:center; background:#fcc;"
| 25 || November 1 || SKA Saint Petersburg || 2-4 || Denis Franskevich || Ice Palace Saint Petersburg || 3,000 || 9-10-5-1 || 38 || 
|-  style="text-align:center; background:#cfc;"
| 26 || November 15 || Avangard Omsk || 4-2 || Alexei Kuznetsov || Kazakhstan Sports Palace || 5,000 || 10-10-5-1 || 41 || 
|-  style="text-align:center; background:#cfc;"
| 27 || November 19 || Khimik Voskresensk || 6-3 || Alexei Kuznetsov || Podmoskovie Sports Palace || 3,100 || 11-10-5-1 || 44 || 
|-  style="text-align:center; background:#fcc;"
| 28 || November 21 || Ak Bars Kazan || 0-7 || Alexei Kuznetsov || TatNeft Arena || 5,100 || 11-11-5-1 || 44 || 
|-  style="text-align:center; background:#cfc;"
| 29 || November 25 || Khimik Voskresensk || 4-2 || Alexei Kuznetsov || Kazakhstan Sports Palace || 5,000 || 12-11-5-1 || 47 || 
|-

|-  style="text-align:center; background:#cfc;"
| 30 || December 1 || Avangard Omsk || 5-2 || Alexei Kuznetsov || Omsk Arena || 8,000 || 13-11-5-1 || 50 || 
|-  style="text-align:center; background:#fcc;"
| 31 || December 6 || SKA Saint Petersburg || 1-4 || Alexei Kuznetsov || Kazakhstan Sports Palace || 5,000 || 13-12-5-1 || 50 || 
|-  style="text-align:center; background:#fcc;"
| 32 || December 8 || Severstal Cherepovets || 1-4 || Alexei Kuznetsov || Kazakhstan Sports Palace || 5,000 || 13-13-5-1 || 50 || 
|-  style="text-align:center; background:#fcc;"
| 33 || December 10 || Lokomotiv Yaroslavl || 3-6 || Marc Lamothe || Kazakhstan Sports Palace || 5,000 || 13-14-5-1 || 50 || 
|-  style="text-align:center; background:#fcc;"
| 34 || December 13 || Dynamo Moscow || 2-7 || Alexei Kuznetsov || Kazakhstan Sports Palace || 5,000 || 13-15-5-1 || 50 || 
|-  style="text-align:center; background:#cfc;"
| 35 || December 22 || Dinamo Minsk || 3-2 || Alexei Kuznetsov || Minsk Sports Palace || 3,200 || 14-15-5-1 || 53 || 
|-  style="text-align:center; background:#fcc;"
| 36 || December 24 || Dynamo Moscow || 6-7 || Alexei Kuznetsov || Luzhniki Minor Arena || 4,500 || 14-16-5-1 || 53 || 
|-  style="text-align:center; background:#d0e7ff;"
| 37 || December 26 || Vityaz Chekhov || 3-2 (OT) || Marc Lamothe || Ice Hockey Center 2004 || 2,700 || 14-16-6-1 || 55 || 
|-  style="text-align:center; background:#fcc;"
| 38 || December 28 || Dinamo Riga || 0-1 || Marc Lamothe || Arena Riga || 8,500 || 14-17-6-1 || 55 || 
|-

|-  style="text-align:center; background:#cfc;"
| 39 || January 4 || Vityaz Chekhov || 11-6 || Marc Lamothe || Kazakhstan Sports Palace || 5,000 || 15-17-6-1 || 58 || 
|-  style="text-align:center; background:#fcc;"
| 40 || January 5 || Spartak Moscow || 3-5 || Alexei Kuznetsov || Kazakhstan Sports Palace || 5,000 || 15-18-6-1 || 58 || 
|-  style="text-align:center; background:#fcc;"
| 41 || January 7 || CSKA Moscow || 2-5 || Denis Franskevich || Kazakhstan Sports Palace || 5,000 || 15-19-6-1 || 58 || 
|-  style="text-align:center; background:#fcc;"
| 42 || January 15 || Torpedo Nizhny Novgorod || 1-6 || Alexei Kuznetsov || Kuznetsk Metallurgists Arena || 5,400 || 15-20-6-1 || 58 || 
|-  style="text-align:center; background:#fcc;"
| 43 || January 17 || Dynamo Moscow || 3-4 || Alexei Kuznetsov || Luzhniki Minor Arena || 3,300 || 15-21-6-1 || 58 || 
|-  style="text-align:center; background:#fcc;"
| 44 || January 19 || Atlant Moscow Oblast || 1-5 || Alexei Kuznetsov || Mytishchi Arena || 5,500 || 15-22-6-1 || 58 || 
|-  style="text-align:center; background:#cfc;"
| 45 || January 21 || HC MVD || 3-0 || Alexei Kuznetsov || Balashikha Arena || 4,300 || 16-22-6-1 || 61 || 
|-  style="text-align:center; background:#d0e7ff;"
| 46 || January 26 || Amur Khabarovsk || 5-4 (SO) || Alexei Kuznetsov || Kazakhstan Sports Palace || 5,000 || 16-22-7-1 || 63 || 
|-  style="text-align:center; background:#cfc;"
| 47 || January 28 || Metallurg Novokuznetsk || 3-1 || Alexei Kuznetsov || Kazakhstan Sports Palace || 5,000 || 17-22-7-1 || 66 || 
|-  style="text-align:center; background:#ffeeaa;"
| 48 || January 30 || Sibir Novosibirsk || 3-4 (SO) || Alexei Kuznetsov || Kazakhstan Sports Palace || 5,000 || 17-22-7-2 || 67 || 
|-

|-  style="text-align:center; background:#fcc;"
| 49 || February 12 || Traktor Chelyabinsk || 1-3 || Alexei Kuznetsov || Traktor Ice Arena || 5,000 || 17-23-7-2 || 67 || 
|-  style="text-align:center; background:#fcc;"
| 50 || February 14 || Metallurg Magnitogorsk || 2-5 || Alexei Kuznetsov || Arena Metallurg || 7,215 || 17-24-7-2 || 67 || 
|-  style="text-align:center; background:#ffeeaa;"
| 51 || February 16 || Salavat Yulaev Ufa || 1-2 (OT) || Alexei Kuznetsov || Ufa Arena || 8,400 || 17-24-7-3 || 68 || 
|-  style="text-align:center; background:#fcc;"
| 52 || February 20 || Ak Bars Kazan || 0-3 || Alexei Kuznetsov || Kazakhstan Sports Palace || 5,000 || 17-25-7-3 || 68 || 
|-  style="text-align:center; background:#ffeeaa;"
| 53 || February 22 || Lada Togliatti || 3-4 (SO) || Alexei Kuznetsov || Kazakhstan Sports Palace || 5,000 || 17-25-7-4 || 69 || 
|-  style="text-align:center; background:#cfc;"
| 54 || February 24 || Neftekhimik Nizhnekamsk || 6-5 || Alexei Kuznetsov || Kazakhstan Sports Palace || 5,000 || 18-25-7-4 || 72 || 
|-  style="text-align:center; background:#cfc;"
| 55 || February 25 || Torpedo Nizhny Novgorod || 5-2 || Alexei Kuznetsov || Kazakhstan Sports Palace || 5,000 || 19-25-7-4 || 75 || 
|-  style="text-align:center; background:#cfc;"
| 56 || February 25 || Vityaz Chekhov || 6-4 || Alexei Kuznetsov || Kazakhstan Sports Palace || 5,000 || 20-25-7-4 || 78 || 
|-

|-
| colspan=11 align="center"|

Playoffs

|-  style="text-align:center; background:#fcc;"
| 1 || March 2 || Ak Bars Kazan || 2–4 || Alexei Kuznetsov || TatNeft Arena || 5,400 || 0-1 || 
|-  style="text-align:center; background:#fcc;"
| 2 || March 3 || Ak Bars Kazan || 2–4 || Alexei Kuznetsov || TatNeft Arena || 4,390 || 0-2 || 
|-  style="text-align:center; background:#fcc;"
| 3 || March 5 || Ak Bars Kazan || 1–2 (SO) || Alexei Kuznetsov || Kazakhstan Sports Palace || 5,000 || 0-3 || 
|-

|-
| colspan=11 align="center"|

Kazakhstan Hockey Championship

Final Round

|-  style="text-align:center; background:#cfc;"
| 1 || March 26 || Yertis Pavlodar || 5-1 || Denis Franskevich || Astana Ice Palace, Pavlodar, Kazakhstan || 1-0-0-0 || 3 || 
|-  style="text-align:center; background:#cfc;"
| 2 || March 27 || Gornyak Rudny || 8-0 || Alexei Kuznetsov || Astana Ice Palace, Pavlodar, Kazakhstan || 2-0-0-0 ||   6 || 
|-  style="text-align:center; background:#cfc;"
| 3 || March 28 || Kazakhmys Satpaev || 9-3 || Alexei Kuznetsov || Astana Ice Palace, Pavlodar, Kazakhstan || 3-0-0-0 || 9 || 
|-  style="text-align:center; background:#cfc;"
| 4 || March 30 || Saryarka Karagandy || 3-1 || Alexei Kuznetsov || Astana Ice Palace, Pavlodar, Kazakhstan || 4-0-0-0 || 12 || 
|-  style="text-align:center; background:#d0e7ff;"
| 5 || March 31 || Kazzinc-Torpedo || 4-3 (SO) || Alexei Kuznetsov || Astana Ice Palace, Pavlodar, Kazakhstan || 4-0-1-0 || 14 || 
|-

|-
| colspan=11 align="center"|

Final roster
Updated March 14, 2010.

|}

See also
2008–09 KHL season

References

Barys Astana seasons
Astana
Barys